The 2017 Philippines Football League was the inaugural season of the Philippines Football League (PFL), the professional football league of the Philippines. The league was officially launched on April 21, 2017, at Shangri-La at the Fort in Taguig, while the first match of the season was played on May 6. The PFL replaced the Metro Manila-based United Football League (UFL), which served as the country's de facto top-level football league from 2009 to 2016. The league was made up of 8 clubs: 6 from the UFL (Ceres, Global, JP Voltes, Kaya, Loyola Meralco Sparks, and Stallion) and 2 expansion teams (Davao Aguilas and Ilocos United). Each club played the others four times (a home-and-away quadruple round-robin format), twice at their home ground and twice at that of their opponents', for 28 games. The teams that finished the season in the top four entered a playoff tournament to determine the league's champion.

The 2017 season was the only PFL season to feature a playoff finals. The top four teams of the league's regular season, which concluded on November 28, progressed to the playoff finals, dubbed as the Finals Series. The Finals Series was held between December 2 and 16 and consisted of a two-legged semifinals, a third-place playoff, and the final match. The final took place on December 16 at the Panaad Stadium in Bacolod, between Ceres–Negros and Global Cebu. Ceres–Negros won the match 4–1 and became the first club to win the PFL title.

Teams
On November 24, 2016, it was reported that at least five teams will join the inaugural season of the PFL. Bacolod-based Ceres–Negros F.C. reportedly will move to Davao City, and a new club will be formed to represent Bacolod or the Negros Island Region. However at the time of the report, nothing has been confirmed by the club or the Philippine Football Federation (PFF). Ceres later denied reports of stating that they will field a second team supposedly to be based in Davao City.

Ceres, Global, Loyola, Stallion, as well as Kaya were confirmed by the PFF on November 29, 2016, as official clubs for the inaugural 2017 season and is projecting that three other clubs will join. By December 2016, JP Voltes joined the list of confirmed 2017 PFL clubs.

It was reported that a total of ten clubs expressed interest to join the league, eight of which have submitted documents required by the PFF according to PFF General Secretary Ed Gastanes. Green Archers United and a club owned by seaport management firm International Container Terminal Services, were the two clubs which withdrew their bid to participate in the league. By April 1, 2017, the PFF has confirmed the participation of 8 clubs.

Stadiums and locations
The PFF confirmed the following clubs with their localities and stadiums that will comprise the inaugural season of the PFL.

Personnel and kits

Managerial changes

Foreign players
A maximum of four foreigners are allowed per club which follows the Asian Football Confederation's (AFC) '3+1 rule'; three players of any nationality and a fourth coming from an AFC member nation.

Players name in bold indicates the player was registered during the mid-season transfer window.

 Former players only include players who left after the start of the 2017 season.
 Also a holder of AFC nationality (Australia)
 Global FC also registered other foreigners for the international competitions.

AFC Champions League : Ahamad Azzawi (Iraq),  Serge Kaole (Ivory Coast)
AFC Cup : Kemy Agustien  (Curaçao), Darryl Roberts (Trinidad and Tobago)
RHB Singapore Cup : Serge Kaole (Ivory Coast), Darryl Roberts (Trinidad and Tobago)

During the mid-season transfer window, Darryl Roberts was added in the PFL team, replacing Sekou Sylla.

 Brad McDonald has both Australia and Papua New Guinea FIFA nationality.

Regular season table

Positions by round

Results by round

Source: Philippines Football League

Results
The eight clubs will play each other four times for twenty eight matches each during the regular season.

First round

Second round

 Match abandoned at halftime due to deteriorating pitch condition by way of adverse weather. As per PFL rules, final score for matches abandoned at halftime and the second half would be the score of the game just prior to abandonment.
 Match deemed a forfeiture due to home stadium unavailability. Kaya awarded a 0–3 win
 Match deemed a forfeiture due to ambulances supposed to be on the venue got involved in an accident. Davao awarded a 0–3 win. Forfeiture affirmed on Nov. 22
 Match deemed a forfeiture due to Ilocos' non-compliance with the league's franchise agreement. Meralco awarded a 0-3 win.
 Match abandoned in the 78rd minute due to "poor visibility". Game ended in 2–2 draw.

Finals Series

The top four teams from the Regular Season qualified and are seeded for the Finals Series' Semifinals. The 1st and 4th ranked clubs of the Regular Season are seeded in the first semifinals while the 2nd and 3rd ranked club were seeded in the second semifinals. The winners of the two-legged semifinals contested for the league title in the final while the losers played in a third place playoff.

Bracket

Semi-finals
All times are in Philippine Standard Time (UTC+8)

Meralco Manila vs Global Cebu (1st vs 4th)

Global Cebu won 3–2 on aggregate.

Ceres–Negros vs Kaya–Makati (2nd vs 3rd)

Ceres–Negros won 3–1 on aggregate.

Third place

Final

Season team rankings
As per statistical convention in football, matches decided in extra time are counted as wins and losses, while matches decided by penalty shoot-outs are counted as draws.

Season statistics

Scoring

Top goalscorers

Top assists

Hat-tricks 

Note
(H) – Home ; (A) – Away

4 Player scored four goals

Clean sheets

Discipline

Red cards

Additionally, players may be suspended for more than a single match due to violations of the PFF Disciplinary Code. The Disciplinary Committee on November 7, 2017, imposed match suspensions and fines to players due to misconduct towards officials and/or other players.

References
Notes

References

External links
Official Website

Philippines Football League
Philippines
2017